William Delany may refer to:
 William Delany (politician)
 William Delany (Jesuit)
 William Delany (bishop)

See also
 William Delaney, Australian cricketer